Ivan Dodig and Marcel Granollers were the defending champions, but chose not to participate together. Dodig was scheduled to play alongside Ben McLachlan, but withdrew with a back injury. Granollers teamed up with Rohan Bopanna, but lost in the quarterfinals to Dominic Inglot and Franko Škugor.

Inglot and Škugor went on to win the title, defeating Alexander and Mischa Zverev in the final 6–2, 7–5.

Seeds

Draw

Draw

Qualifying

Seeds

Qualifiers
  Guillermo García López /  David Marrero

Lucky losers
  Robert Lindstedt /  Fabrice Martin

Qualifying draw

References
 Main Draw
 Qualifying Draw

Swiss Indoors - Doubles